The 2006 CAF Champions League Final was a football tie held over two legs in December 2006. Al-Ahly of Egypt beat CS Sfaxien of Tunisia 2-1.

Qualified teams 
In the following table, finals until 1996 were in the African Cup of Champions Club era, since 1997 were in the CAF Champions League era.

Background 
Al-Ahly were the defending champions after winning the compatriot of CS Sfaxien, Étoile du Sahel 3–0, reaching a total of five finals, winning four (1982, 1987, 2001, 2005) and losing one (1983) while CS Sfaxien reached the final for the first time ever.
Both teams met in the Group stage, with each victorious in their home matches - CS Sfaxien winning 1–0, while Al Ahly won 2–1. Both teams qualified for the semifinals on the second-last matchday. In the semifinals CS Sfaxien defeated Orlando Pirates 1–0 on aggregate, winning the second leg at home by that score, with the first leg ending in a scoreless draw. Al Ahly faced ASEC Mimosas from Ivory Coast and won the first leg 2–0 at home. In the second leg, Al Ahly lost 1–2 but reached the final.

Venues

Cairo International Stadium

Cairo International Stadium, formerly known as Nasser Stadium, is an Olympic-standard, multi-use stadium with an all-seated capacity of 75,000. The architect of the stadium is the German Werner March, who had built from 1934 to 1936 the Olympic Stadium in Berlin. Before becoming an all seater stadium, it had the ability to hold over 100,000 spectators, reaching a record of 120,000. It is the foremost Olympic-standard facility befitting the role of Cairo, Egypt as the center of events in the region. It is also the 69th largest stadium in the world. Located in Nasr City; a suburb north east of Cairo, it was completed in 1960, and was inaugurated by President Gamal Abd El Nasser on 23 July that year, the eighth anniversary of the Egyptian Revolution of 1952. Zamalek SC currently use the Petro Sport Stadium for most of their home games and Al Ahly use Al Salam Stadium for most of their home games.

7 November Stadium

7 November Stadium is a multi-purpose stadium in Radès, Tunis, Tunisia about 10 kilometers south-east of the city center of Tunis, in the center of the Olympic City. It is currently used mostly for football matches and it also has facilities for athletics.  The stadium holds 60,000 and was built in 2001 for the 2001 Mediterranean Games  and is considered to be one of the best stadiums in Africa. The stadium was built for the 2001 Mediterranean Games, the 60,000-seat covered area covers 13,000 m2 and consists of a central area, 3 adjoining grounds, 2 warm-up rooms, 2 paintings and an official stand of 7,000 seats. The press gallery is equipped with 300 desks.

Club Africain and ES Tunis play their major league matches here. Before the construction of this stadium, the Tunis derby used to be played in the 45,000 seat-capacity Stade El Menzah. It is also the stadium of Tunisia national football team since 2001.

This stadium has hosted matches of the 2004 African Cup of Nations which was won by the Tunisian team.

The management of CS Sfaxien confirmed that it was necessary to transfer the match from the Stade Taïeb Mhiri in Sfax, which was held by all the matches of the team in the African competition this season to the Radès Stadium, because the capacity of the Radès Stadium is 60,000 spectators, while the capacity of the Stade Taïeb Mhiri does not exceed 20,000, which is what confirms the organization of the match on the field of the stadium of Sfax was difficult.

Road to the final 

Note: In all results below, the score of the finalist is given first.

Format
The final was decided over two legs, with aggregate goals used to determine the winner. If the sides were level on aggregate after the second leg, the away goals rule would have been applied, and if still level, the tie would have proceeded directly to a penalty shootout (no extra time is played).

Matches

First leg

Second leg

Assistant referees:
Hong Adogovi (Benin)
Shanti Adrian (Benin)
Fourth official:
Jalloul Azouz (Tunisia)

Notes and references 

 2006 CAF Champions League - cafonline.com

CAF Champions League Finals
Final
1
CS Sfaxien matches
Al Ahly SC matches